There have been two baronetcies created for persons with the surname Perring, both in the Baronetage of the United Kingdom. One creation is extinct while one is still extant.

The Perring Baronetcy, of Membland in the County of Devon, was created in the Baronetage of the United Kingdom on 3 October 1808 for the Lord Mayor of London John Perring. The title became extinct on the death of the fourth Baronet in 1920.

The Perring Baronetcy, of Frensham Manor in the County of Surrey, was created in the Baronetage of the United Kingdom on 27 November 1963 for the businessman and public servant Ralph Perring. He was Lord Mayor of London from 1962 to 1963. As of 2020 the title is held by his grandson, the third Baronet, who succeeded in that year.

Perring baronets, of Membland (1808)
Sir John Perring, 1st Baronet (1765–1831)
Sir John Perring, 2nd Baronet (1794–1843)
Sir Philip Perring, 3rd Baronet (1797–1866)
Sir Philip Perring, 4th Baronet (1828–1920)

Perring baronets, of Frensham Manor (1963)
Sir Ralph Edgar Perring, 1st Baronet (1905–1998)
Sir John Raymond Perring, 2nd Baronet (1931–2020) m. Ella Pelham (1940-2019)
Sir John Simon Pelham Perring, 3rd Baronet (born 1962)

The heir presumptive is the current baronet's younger brother, Mark Ralph Pelham Perring (born 1965)

Notes

References
Kidd, Charles, Williamson, David (editors). Debrett's Peerage and Baronetage (1990 edition). New York: St Martin's Press, 1990.

External links
Short biography of Sir Ralph Perring, 1st Baronet

Baronetcies in the Baronetage of the United Kingdom
Extinct baronetcies in the Baronetage of the United Kingdom